Parakkad  is a village in Thrissur district in the state of Kerala, India.The main landmark  in parakkad is cheloor kunnu ayappa temple.The main town near to parakkad is Thrissur.

Demographics
 India census, Parakkad had a population of 7759 with 3776 males and 3983 females.

References

Villages in Thrissur district